Cornelia Sorabji (15 November 1866 – 6 July 1954) was an Indian lawyer, social reformer and writer. She was the first female graduate from Bombay University, and the first woman to study law at Oxford University. Returning to India after her studies at Oxford, Sorabji became involved in social and advisory work on behalf of the purdahnashins, women who were forbidden to communicate with the outside male world, but she was unable to defend them in court since, as a woman, she did not hold professional standing in the Indian legal system. Hoping to remedy this, Sorabji presented herself for the LLB examination of Bombay University in 1897 and the pleader's examination of Allahabad High Court in 1899. She became the first female advocate in India but would not be recognised as a barrister until the law which barred women from practising was changed in 1923.

She was involved with several social service campaigning groups, including the National Council for Women in India, the Federation of University Women, and the Bengal League of Social Service for Women. She opposed the imposition of Western perspectives on the movement for women's change in India, and took a cautious approach to social reform, opposing rapid change. Sorabji believed that until all women were educated, political reform would not be of genuine lasting value. She supported the British Raj, and purdah for upper-caste Hindu women, and opposed Indian self-rule. Her views prevented her obtaining the support needed to undertake later social reforms. Sorabji authored multiple publications, which were influential in the early 20th century.

Early life and education

Cornelia Sorabji was born on 15 November 1866 in Nashik, in the Bombay Presidency, British India. She was one of ten children, and was named in honour of Lady Cornelia Maria Darling Ford, her adoptive grandmother. Her father, the Reverend Sorabji Karsedji, was a Christian missionary who had converted from Zoroastrianism, and Sorabji believed that she had been a key figure in convincing Bombay University to admit women to its degree programmes. Her mother, Francina Ford (née Santya), had been adopted at the age of twelve and brought up by a British couple, and helped to establish several girls' schools in Poona (now Pune). Her mother's support for girls' education, and care for the local needy, was an inspiration for Cornelia Sorabji to advocate for women. In her books, Cornelia Sorabji barely touched on religion (other than describing Parsi rituals), and did not write about any pressures relating to religious conversion in her autobiographical works.

Sorabji had five surviving sisters including educator and missionary Susie Sorabji and medical doctor Alice Pennell, and one surviving brother;  two other  brothers died in infancy. She spent her childhood initially in Belgaum and later in Pune. She received her education both at home and at mission schools. She enrolled in Deccan College, as its first woman student, and received the top marks in her cohort for the final degree examination, which would have entitled her to a government scholarship to study further in England. According to Sorabji, she was denied the scholarship, and instead took up a temporary position as a professor of English at Gujarat College, an educational institution for men.

She became the first female graduate of Bombay University, with a first-class degree in literature. Sorabji wrote in 1888 to the National Indian Association for assistance in completing her education. This was championed by Mary Hobhouse (whose husband Arthur was a member of the Council of India) and Adelaide Manning, who contributed funds, as did Florence Nightingale, Sir William Wedderburn and others. Sorabji arrived in England in 1889 and stayed with Manning and Hobhouse. In 1892, she was given special permission by Congregational Decree, due in large part to the petitions of her English friends, to take the post-graduate Bachelor of Civil Law exam at Somerville College, Oxford, becoming the first woman to ever do so. Sorabji was the first woman to be admitted as a reader to the Codrington Library of All Souls College, Oxford, at Sir William Anson's invitation in 1890.

Legal career

Upon returning to India in 1894, Sorabji became involved in social and advisory work on behalf of the purdahnashins, women who were forbidden to communicate with the outside male world. In many cases, these women owned considerable property, yet had no access to the necessary legal expertise to defend it. Sorabji was given special permission to enter pleas on their behalf before British agents of Kathiawar and Indore principalities, but she was unable to defend them in court since, as a woman, she did not hold professional standing in the Indian legal system. Hoping to remedy this situation, Sorabji presented herself for the LLB examination of Bombay University in 1897 and the pleader's examination of Allahabad High Court in 1899. She was the first female advocate in India, but would not be recognised as a barrister until the law which barred women from practising was changed in 1923.

Sorabji began petitioning the India Office as early as 1902 to provide for a female legal advisor to represent women and minors in provincial courts. In 1904, she was appointed Lady Assistant to the Court of Wards of Bengal and by 1907, due to the need for such representation, Sorabji was working in the provinces of Bengal, Bihar, Orissa, and Assam. In the next 20 years of service, it is estimated that Sorabji helped over 600 women and orphans fight legal battles, sometimes at no charge. She would later write about many of these cases in her work Between the Twilights and her two autobiographies. In 1924, the legal profession was opened to women in India, and Sorabji began practising in Calcutta. However, due to male bias and discrimination, she was confined to preparing opinions on cases, rather than pleading them before the court.

Sorabji retired from the high court in 1929, and settled in London, visiting India during the winters. She died at her home, Northumberland House on Green Lanes in Manor House, London, on 6 July 1954, aged 87.

Social and reform work
Sorabji's primary interest in her campaigning work was in social service. She took a circumspect approach to social reform, supporting the British Raj, purdah for upper-caste Hindu women, and opposing rapid reform, believing that until all women were educated, political reform would not provide "any real and lasting value". She also opposed the imposition of Western women's perspectives on the movement for women's change in India.

She was associated with the Bengal branch of the National Council for Women in India, the Federation of University Women, and the Bengal League of Social Service for Women. For her services to the Indian nation, she was awarded the Kaisar-i-Hind Gold Medal in 1909. Although an Anglophile, Sorabji had no desire to see "the wholesale imposition of a British legal system on Indian society any more than she sought the transplantation of other Western values." Early in her career, Sorabji had supported the campaign for Indian independence, relating women's rights to the capacity for self-government. Although she supported traditional Indian life and culture, Sorabji promoted reform of Hindu laws regarding child marriage and Sati by widows. She believed that the true impetus behind social change was education and that until the majority of illiterate women had access to it, the suffrage movement would be a failure.

By the late 1920s, however, Sorabji had adopted a staunch anti-nationalist attitude. By 1927, she was actively involved in promoting support for the Empire and preserving the rule of the British Raj. She favourably viewed the polemical attack on Indian self-rule in Katherine Mayo's book Mother India (1927), and condemned Mahatma Gandhi's campaign of civil disobedience. She toured to propagate her political views; her publicised beliefs would end up costing her the support needed to undertake later social reforms. One such failed project was the League for Infant Welfare, Maternity, and District Nursing.

Pallavi Rastogi, reviewing the autobiography India Calling, wrote the Sorabji's life was "fraught with contradictions", as were those of others who were unable to reconcile Western and Indian ways of life. Historian Geraldine Forbes argued that Sorabji's opposition to nationalism and feminism has "caused historians to neglect the role she played in giving credibility to the British critique of those educated women who were now part of the political landscape." For Leslie Flemming, Sorabji's autobiographical works are "a means of justifying her unusual life by constructing herself as a change-agent" and, although they are not widely read in modern terms, succeeded on those terms by having an influential readership in the early 20th century.

Publications
In addition to her work as a social reformer and legal activist, Sorabji wrote a number of books, short stories and articles, including the following:
1901: Love and Life beyond the Purdah (London: Fremantle & Co.)
1904: Sun-Babies: Studies in the Child-life of India (London: Blackie & Son)
1908: Between the Twilights: Being studies of India women by one of themselves  (London: Harper)
1916: Indian Tales of the Great Ones Among Men, Women and Bird-People (Bombay: Blackie)
1917: The Purdahnashin (Bombay: Blackie & Son)
1918: Sun Babies: Studies in Colour (London: Blackie & Son)
1920: Shubala – A Child-Mother (Calcutta: Baptist Mission Press)
1924: Therefore: An Impression of Sorabji Kharshedji Langrana and His Wife Francina (London: Oxford University Press, Humphrey Milford, 1924)
1930: Gold Mohur: Time to Remember (London: Alexander Moring)
1932: Susie Sorabji, Christian-Parsee Educationist of Western India: A Memoir (London: Oxford University Press)

Sorabji wrote two autobiographical works entitled India Calling: The Memories of Cornelia Sorabji (London: Nisbet & Co., 1934) and India Recalled (London: Nisbet & Co., 1936). She edited Queen Mary's Book for India (London: G. G. Harrap & Co., 1943), which had contributions from such authors as T. S. Eliot and Dorothy L. Sayers. She contributed to a number of periodicals, including The Asiatic Review, The Times Literary Supplement, Atlantic Monthly, Calcutta Review, The Englishman, Macmillan's Magazine, The Statesman and The Times.

Memorials
In 2012, a bust of her was unveiled at Lincoln's Inn, London. A Google Doodle celebrated her 151st birthday on 15 November 2017.

See also
First women lawyers around the world
List of Parsis

References

Bibliography

Further reading
 Blain, Virginia, et al.,The Feminist Companion to Writers in English: Women Writers from the Middle Ages to the Present (New Haven : Yale University Press, 1990)
 Burton, Antoinette, At The Heart of the Empire: Indians and the Colonial Encounter in Late-Victorian Britain (Berkeley: University of California Press, 1998)
 Matthew, H.C.G and Brian Harrison, ed., Oxford Dictionary of National Biography (Oxford : Oxford University Press, 2004)
 Mossman, Mary Jane, The First Women Lawyers: A Comparative Study of Gender, Law and the Legal Professions (Toronto: Hart Publishing, 2007)
 Sorabji, Richard, Opening Doors: The Untold Story of Cornelia Sorabji (2010)
 Zilboorg, Caroline, ed. Women's Firsts (New York : Gale, 1997)
 Innes, C.L. 'A History of Black and Asian Writers in Britain' (Cambridge: Cambridge University Press, 2008). Contains a Chapter on Cornelia and Alice Pennell Sorabji.

External links 

 Cornelia Sorabji images Link to images of Sorabji at the National Portrait Gallery website
 'Celebrating Indian legacy in Oxford' University of Oxford Press Release, March 2010
 'Opening Doors: The Untold Story of Cornelia Sorabji – Reformer, Lawyer and Champion of Women's Rights in India' Public lecture by Professor Richard Sorabji

1866 births
1954 deaths
Indian barristers
19th-century Indian lawyers
Indian women lawyers
20th-century Indian lawyers
Recipients of the Kaisar-i-Hind Medal
University of Mumbai alumni
Alumni of Somerville College, Oxford
Indian Christians
People from Nashik
Parsi people
Indian reformers
Indian women activists
Indian women's rights activists
Activists from Maharashtra
Writers from Maharashtra
Women writers from Maharashtra
Indian women novelists
Indian women essayists
Indian women short story writers
19th-century Indian women writers
20th-century Indian novelists
20th-century Indian short story writers
20th-century Indian essayists
20th-century Indian women writers
19th-century Indian novelists
Novelists from Maharashtra
20th-century Indian women lawyers
19th-century Indian women lawyers